Times-Picayune Publishing Co. v. United States, 345 U.S. 594 (1953), is an antitrust law decision by the United States Supreme Court. In a 5–4 decision it held that a tie-in sale of morning and evening newspaper advertising space does not violate the Sherman Antitrust Act, because there was no market dominance in the tying product.

See also
List of United States Supreme Court cases, volume 345
Jefferson Parish Hospital Dist. No. 2 v. Hyde (1984), a case involving "tying arrangements"
United States v. Loew's Inc. (1962), a case on product bundling

References

Further reading

External links
 

1953 in United States case law
United States antitrust case law
United States Supreme Court cases
United States Supreme Court cases of the Vinson Court
Business ethics cases